Amelia Rueda Ahumada, born in Buenos Aires on October 3, 1951, is a Costa Rican journalist who began her career in 1974 and has been practicing for more than 40 years.

Career 
She has worked in different media outlets including:

 Telenoticias Canal 7
 Canal 2: First in Contacto Directo and then in Noticiero Univisión
 Repretel 6: Esta Mañana and Aló qué tal?

Currently, she is the information director of the company Central de Radios and hosts the program Nuestra Voz (Our Voice).

She was involved in the investigation carried out at the Panamanian law firm Mossack Fonseca in relation to the documents called "Panama Papers". This research was developed by the Semanario Universidad in conjunction with ameliarueda.com.

Awards 
 Ángela Acuña Braun Award for gender issues
 UNICEF Award for Communication
 Award for best program director and scriptwriter for Our Voice on Radio Monumental
 Golden Microphone by the Federation of Radio and Television Associations of Spain (2003).

References 

1951 births
Costa Rican women journalists
Living people